Keys to Tulsa is a 1997 American crime film directed by Leslie Greif, and starring Eric Stoltz and James Spader. It is based on the novel of the same name by Brian Fair Berkey. There is  an unrated version that runs 3 minutes longer than the theatrical release.

Plot
The story revolves around a perpetual loser and slacker named Richter Boudreau (Eric Stoltz). Richter is from a privileged background in Tulsa, Oklahoma and works as a movie reviewer at a local newspaper only because his sour widowed mother Cynthia (Mary Tyler Moore) pulled strings for him to land the job. He is dissatisfied with the direction that his life has taken; he is about to be fired any day from his job because he can't meet deadlines, he lives in a dilapidated farmhouse, he uses and sells drugs behind the scenes for some extra cash, and he is so irresponsible with life and finances in which he has gotten so far behind on his bills that his electricity has just been cut off which ruins a blind date he has in the opening scene with a neurotic gold-digger named Trudy (Cameron Diaz).

Richter also owes money to Ronnie Stover (James Spader), an abusive drug dealer who he deals with. Ronnie is married to Vicky (Deborah Kara Unger), a beautiful woman who was disowned by her socially prominent family for her involvement with Ronnie. Richter is still in love with Vicky despite having ended their relationship many years before. Vicky is the sister of Keith (Michael Rooker), a misogynistic alcoholic whose large inheritance fails to soothe his anger, loneliness, and depression. Cherry (Joanna Going) is an exotic dancer from Chicago who buys drugs from Ronnie and gets romantically involved with Richter.

Richter learns that Ronnie plans to blackmail Bedford Shaw (Marco Perella), the son of a socially prominent businessman named Harmon Shaw (James Coburn), after Cherry tells Richter that Bedford Shaw murdered her friend, a stripper/prostitute, in a motel room and that she took photographs. Ronnie attempts to involve Richter by having him hold on to a mysterious black pouch and by exploiting Richter's newspaper connections. Richter wants no part of the blackmail scheme. But he gets in over his head when Keith discovers that Richter has been sleeping with Vicky.

Cast

Background
For the role of Ronnie Stover, James Spader dyed his hair from light brown to black. Spader was friends with co-star Eric Stoltz, who also worked with him on The New Kids (1985) and 2 Days in the Valley (1996).

The soundtrack prominently features the Australian didgeridoo instrument, performed by Graham Wiggins.

Release and reception
Keys to Tulsa received a limited theatrical release in the United States during April 1997. It was reviewed on the April 12, 1997 episode of Siskel and Ebert, which coincidentally also featured a review of another Eric Stoltz film, Anaconda. It received a thumbs down from both Gene Siskel and Roger Ebert. The San Francisco Chronicle stated it had "far too many minor characters", as well as "[more] than enough for three or four mediocre movies." Marc Savlov of The Austin Chronicle remarked in 1997, "When a film with a cast this stellar falls flat on its face like this one does, well, it makes you wanna holler." Savlov also noted that, "After the romantic interlude of Joanna Going's performance in Still Breathing (which to date has only screened at film festivals -- such as SXSW), it's a shock, of sorts, to see her as an alcoholic topless dancer with a penchant for being in the wrong place at the wrong time. Not a bad shock, mind you, just, you know, a shock. She's miscast."

Deseret News movie critic Chris Hicks criticized the film in his April 1997 review. He wrote, "Writer-director Leslie Greif (Heaven's Prisoners, Meet Wally Sparks) has allowed some racist underpinnings to creep in as his characters refer with some frequency to black people by using a particularly unpleasant epithet. And there aren't any black characters to balance the film, save one — a hooker who is brutally violated and beaten to death." Hicks concluded his review by remarking, "There are some solid laughs early on, and if the humor had held up throughout it might have redeemed the picture. But instead, the film just meanders along until it runs completely out of steam."

A more positive review came from Variety'''s Todd McCarthy, who called it a "wonderfully written and performed comic crime meller." He states, "Keys to Tulsa might seem on paper to be one more unneeded, late-in-the-cycle Tarantino retread. But this distinctively tasty dish adroitly mixes its genre ingredients with fresh takes on class grudges, Great Plains lifestyles, generational and family strains and life stasis in a way that makes it a satisfying meal unto itself [...] Peyton’s beautifully constructed script nails the shifting motivations and subtext of every scene and provides spiky dialogue to boot. The colorfully eclectic cast also delivers in spades, with Stoltz holding his own as “the black sheep son of a black sheep” while watching several of his co-stars run away with thesping honors in some dazzling turns."

It was given a UK theatrical release during August 1997. British critic Ryan Gilbey, writing for The Independent, remarked, "What on earth is going on in Keys to Tulsa? [...] this nonsensical picture appears to have been directed by a coma victim and edited by an axe maniac."

In his 1999 book Cinema of Outsiders: The Rise of American Independent Film, Emanuel Levy wrote that, "The Tarantino effect seems to be in decline, judging by the failure of such offshoots as Keys to Tulsa (1997) and Very Bad Things (1998). Harley Peyton's script from Brian Fair Berkey's novel is deft and witty, but Leslie Grief's awkward direction in Keys to Tulsa lacks modulation and visual style." Keys to Tulsa was included in Magill's Cinema Annual 1998: A Survey of the Films of 1997'', with the book characterizing it as being "long on bizarre, colorful characters, but short on any kind of cohesive, interesting plot."

Home video
The film was released to the American home video market on September 2, 1997. It came in both rated and unrated versions, with the latter including several instances of nudity involving Joanna Going's character. On December 17, 2002, it was released to DVD by Artisan. Liberation Hall later reissued the film in December 2020.

References

External links
 
 
 

1997 films
1997 crime films
1997 independent films
ITC Entertainment films
American crime films
American independent films
Films about dysfunctional families
Films based on American novels
Films based on crime novels
Films set in Oklahoma
Films set in Tulsa, Oklahoma
PolyGram Filmed Entertainment films
Gramercy Pictures films
1990s English-language films
1990s American films
1997 directorial debut films